Teralba Colliery was a mine located at Teralba, New South Wales, Australia.

The mine was opened in 1978 by Broken Hill Proprietary Company Limited. Long wall mining was undertaken from the mine until May 2001, when the mine was shut down. Teralba Shaft No. 1 and Teralba Shaft No. 2 have been filled.

A 4 MW Waste Coal Mine Gas (Methane) generator is at the site providing electricity into the grid.

References
 

1978 establishments in Australia
2001 disestablishments in Australia
Coal mines in New South Wales
City of Lake Macquarie
Mines in New South Wales
Xstrata